Dow Jones & Company, Inc. is an American publishing firm owned by News Corp and led by CEO Almar Latour.

The company publishes The Wall Street Journal, Barron's, MarketWatch, Mansion Global, Financial News and Private Equity News. It formerly published the Dow Jones Industrial Average.

History
The company was founded in 1882 by three reporters: Charles Dow, Edward Jones, and Charles Bergstresser. Charles Dow was widely known for his ability to break down and convey what was often considered very convoluted financial information and news to the general public - this is one of the reasons why Dow Jones & Company is well known for their publications and transferring of important and sometimes difficult to understand financial information to people across the globe. Nevertheless, the three reporters were joined in control of the organization by Thomas F. Woodlock.

Dow Jones was acquired in 1902 by Clarence Barron, the leading financial journalist of the day, after the death of co-founder Charles Dow.  Upon Barron's death in 1928, control of the company passed to his stepdaughters Jane and Martha Bancroft. The company was led by the Bancroft family, which effectively controlled 64% of all voting stock, until 2007 when an extended takeover battle saw News Corporation acquire the business. The company then became a subsidiary of News Corporation. It was reported on August 1, 2007, that the bid had been successful after an extended period of uncertainty about shareholder agreement, with the transaction finalized on December 13, 2007. It was worth US$5 billion or $60 a share, giving News Corp control of The Wall Street Journal and ending the Bancroft family's 105 years of ownership.

The company was best known for the publication of the Dow Jones Industrial Average and related market statistics, Dow Jones Newswire, and a number of financial publications.  In 2010 the Dow Jones Indexes subsidiary was sold to the CME Group and the company focused on financial news publications, including its flagship publication The Wall Street Journal and providing financial news and information tools to financial companies.

In April 2020, Dow Jones CEO William Lewis announced he would be stepping down from his position after nearly six years in the role.

On May 7, 2020 News Corp announced that Almar Latour would assume the CEO role on May 15, 2020.

Products

Consumer media
Its flagship publication, The Wall Street Journal, is a daily newspaper in print and online covering business, financial national and international news and issues around the globe. It began publishing on July 8, 1889. There are 12 versions of the Journal in nine languages, including English, Chinese, Japanese, German, Spanish, Portuguese, Malay, Turkish and Korean. The Journal holds 35 Pulitzer Prizes for outstanding journalism.

Other consumer-oriented publications of Dow Jones include Barron's Magazine, a weekly overview of the world economy and markets, MarketWatch, an online financial news site, and Investor's Business Daily, a newspaper and website covering the stock market, international business, finance and economics. Financial News provides news on investment banking, securities, and asset management. BigCharts, provided by MarketWatch's Virtual Stock Exchange Games, includes stock charts, screeners, interactive charting, and research tools. Professor Journal is a "Journal" in education program for professors to integrate into curriculum.

In 2017, Dow Jones launched Moneyish, a lifestyle and personal finance website aimed at millennial readers.

Dow Jones also published Heat Street, an online news and opinion website launched in February 2016 that was later folded into MarketWatch.

The monthly journal Far Eastern Economic Review closed in September 2009.

Enterprise media
Dow Jones serves corporate markets and financial markets clients with financial news and information products and services. Dow Jones owns more than 20 products that combine content and technology to help drive decisions, which include:
 Dow Jones Newswires;
 Dow Jones Factiva, a database that provides a curated basis for making decisions through search results, alerts, newsletters, and charts about companies, topics, and people;
 Dow Jones FX Select, delivers real-time, breaking global FX news, expert trend analysis and in-depth policy commentary in 13 languages;
 Dow Jones VentureSource, provides data on venture-backed companies and helps find deal and partnership opportunities, perform comprehensive due diligence and examine trends in venture capital investment, fund-raising and liquidity;
 Private Equity Analyst, timely news and critical analysis of private equity and venture capital activity, offering insight and breaking news on developments in fund-raising, investment, deal finance, liquidity, returns, and executive moves;
 Dow Jones Risk & Compliance, on risk management, regulatory compliance or corporate governance content for Anti-Corruption, Anti-Money Laundering, and Payments and Sanctions.

Dow Jones Newswires
Dow Jones Newswires is the real-time financial news organization founded in 1882, its primary competitors are Bloomberg L.P. and Thomson Reuters. The company reports more than 600,000 subscribers — including brokers, traders, analysts, world leaders, and finance officials and fund managers — as of July 2011.

Ventures
In 2009 Dow Jones Ventures launched FINS.com, a standalone resource for financial professionals with information about finance careers and the finance industry.

Broadcasting
In broadcasting, Dow Jones provides news content to CNBC in the U.S. It produced two shows for commercial radio, The Wall Street Journal Report on the Wall Street Journal Radio Network and The Dow Jones Report. The network was shut down in 2014.

Dow Jones also launched WSJ Live an interactive video website that provides live and on demand videos from The Wall Street Journal Video Network.  Programs include "News Hub", "MoneyBeat", and "Lunch Break" among others. WSJ Live was shut down in 2017.

Indices

Dow Jones sold a 90% stake in its Index business for $607.5M to Chicago-based CME Group, which owns the Chicago Mercantile Exchange, in February 2010. A few of the most widely used include:

Dow Jones Industrial Average (DJIA, "Dow 30", or often simply "The Dow")
Dow Jones Transportation Average
Dow Jones Utility Average
Dow Jones Composite Average
The Global Dow
Dow Jones Global Titans 50 Index
Dow Jones Total Stock Market Index
Dow Jones Sustainability Indexes
Dow Jones-UBS Commodity Indexes
Dow Jones Target Date Indexes

NewsPicks USA

In March 2017, Dow Jones and NewsPicks Inc., a Japanese firm that develops and operates a business news platform of the same name, established a joint venture called NewsPicks USA, LLC. The joint venture is headed by CEO Ken Breen, who is currently the Senior Vice President, Commercial, for the Dow Jones Media Group, together with Chairman Yusuke Umeda, who is also the Director of NewsPicks Inc.

The joint venture launched the English version of the NewsPicks platform for the US market on November 13, 2017. Similar to the original Japanese edition, the US edition of NewsPicks combines business news from sources like The Wall Street Journal, Bloomberg, and Reuters with social networking features, such as comments on news articles from top-ranked business professionals from around the world ("ProPickers"). The platform currently has a smartphone app for the iPhone with plans for release on Android in the future.

The venture was dissolved in October of 2018 with the Japanese parent company retaining full ownership.

Ownership 
The company's foundation was laid by Charles Dow, Edward Jones and Charles Bergstresser who, over two decades, conceived and promoted the three products which define Dow Jones and financial journalism: The Wall Street Journal, Dow Jones Newswires and the Dow Jones Industrial Average.

Dow Jones was acquired in 1902 by the leading financial journalist of the day, Clarence Barron.

In 2007, Dow Jones was acquired by News Corp., a leading global media company.

The Bancroft family and heirs of Clarence W. Barron effectively controlled the company's class B shares, each with a voting power of ten regular shares, prior to its sale to News Corp. At one time, they controlled 64% of Dow Jones voting stock.

Currently, Dow Jones is owned by Rupert Murdoch, owner of News Corp and several other major media companies.

Buyout offer 
On May 1, 2007, Dow Jones released a statement confirming that News Corporation, led by Rupert Murdoch, had made an unsolicited offer of $60 per share, or $5 billion, for Dow Jones. Stock was briefly halted for pending press release. The halt lasted under 10 minutes while CNBC was receiving data. It has been suggested that the buyout offer is related to Murdoch's new cable business news channel Fox Business that launched in 2007. The Dow Jones brand brings instant credibility to the project.

On June 6, 2007, CEO Brian Tierney of Philadelphia Media Holdings L.L.C., owning company of The Philadelphia Inquirer, Philadelphia Daily News, and Philly.com, went public in an article on Philly.com expressing interest in "joining with outside partners to buy Dow Jones." Tierney said, "We would participate as Philadelphia Media Holdings, along with other investors. We wouldn't do it alone."

In June, MySpace co-founder Brad Greenspan put forth a bid to buy 25% of Dow Jones for $60 a share, the same price per share as News Corporation's bid. Greenspan's offer was for $1.25 billion for 25% of the company.

On July 17, 2007, The Wall Street Journal, a unit of Dow Jones, reported that the company and News Corporation had agreed in principle on a US$5 billion takeover, that the offer would be put to the full Dow Jones board on the same evening in New York, and that the offer valued the company at 70% more than the company's market value.

Insider trading scandal
Upon investigating suspicious share price movements in the run-up to the announcement, the SEC alleged that board member Sir David Li, one of Hong Kong's most prominent businessmen, had informed his close friend and business associate Michael Leung of the impending offer. Leung had acted on this information by telling his daughter and son-in-law, who reaped a US$8.2 million profit from the insider trading transaction.

Corporate governance
Prior to its sale to News Corp, the last members of the board of directors of the company were: Christopher Bancroft, Lewis B. Campbell, Michael Elefante, John Engler, Harvey Golub, Leslie Hill, Irvine Hockaday, Peter Kann, David Li, M. Peter McPherson (Chairman), Frank Newman, James Ottaway, Elizabeth Steele, and William Steere.

See also

Closing milestones of the Dow Jones Industrial Average
List of assets owned by Dow Jones

References

External links

Dow Jones corporate history
Dow Jones Indexes corporate site 
Dow Jones Stock Indexes averages research site
Dow Jones Indexes video on indexing using Latin America as an example
Yahoo! Finance - Dow Jones & Company, Inc. Company Profile
Overview of company history "Dow Jones Saga Reflects The Forces That Shaped The Wall Street Journal"

 
Financial services companies established in 1882
Companies based in New York City
American companies established in 1882
News Corporation subsidiaries
Mass media companies of the United States
Financial data vendors
2007 mergers and acquisitions